Röpcke is a German language surname. It stems from the male given name Rupprecht – and may refer to:
Jo Röpcke (1928–2007), Belgian film critic, film journalist, director and television host
Thies Röpcke (1954), German former professional tennis player

References 

German-language surnames
Surnames from given names